Selviytyjät Suomi (season 7) is the seventh season of the Finnish reality television series Selviytyjät Suomi. The season returns to Malaysia for the first time since 2013 where eight new celebrity contestants face off against eight former contestants returning for a second chance to win the prize of €30,000 and the title of Sole Survivor. The season premiered on 27 August 2022 on Nelonen. The finale aired on 4 December 2022 where Sami Helenius won against Tommi Manninen in a 4-3 jury vote to win €30,000 and claim the title of Sole Survivor.

Contestants

Season Summary

Voting history

Notes

References

External links

2022 Finnish television seasons
Survivor Finland seasons